Hamilton Hall is a National Historic Landmark at 9 Chestnut Street in Salem, Massachusetts. Designed by noted Salem builder Samuel McIntire and built in 1805–1807, it is an excellent instance of a public Federal style building. It was built as a social space for the leading families of Salem, and was named for Founding Father and Federalist Party leader Alexander Hamilton. It continues to function as a social hall today: it is used for events, private functions, weddings and is also home to a series of lectures that originated in 1944 by the Ladies Committee.

Hamilton Hall is a three-story brick structure at the corner of Chestnut and Cambridge Streets, with its gable end front facing Cambridge Street. The brick is laid in a Flemish bond pattern. The entrance facade is five bays wide, with a center entry consisting of double doors sheltered by a Greek Revival porch added c. 1845. This rectangular portico has a flat roof, supported at each corner by two Doric columns. The first floor of the long side (facing Chestnut Street) consists of six bays, of which five are windows and one is a door. The upper level (equal in height to the upper two levels on the front facade) consists of five large Palladian windows set in a slightly recessed arch. Above each of these is a panel with decorations carved by McIntire. The outer four have a swag design, while the central one features an eagle and shield.

Construction of the hall was funded by a group of Salem's Federalist merchant families, and cost $22,000. Originally, retail spaces at the entrance on the ground floor housed vendors who sold goods for use in the events held in the upstairs function space. The second level ballroom features an unusual curved balcony and a sprung floor suitable for dancing.

The building was declared a National Historic Landmark and listed on the National Register of Historic Places in 1970. It is a contributing property to the Chestnut Street District, and part of the local McIntire Historic District, in which a high concentration of McIntire's works are found.

See also
 List of National Historic Landmarks in Massachusetts
 National Register of Historic Places listings in Salem, Massachusetts
 National Register of Historic Places listings in Essex County, Massachusetts

References

Buildings and structures in Salem, Massachusetts
National Register of Historic Places in Salem, Massachusetts
National Historic Landmarks in Massachusetts
1807 establishments in Massachusetts
1800s architecture in the United States
Federal architecture in Massachusetts
Historic district contributing properties in Massachusetts